Abydos Station is a pastoral lease and cattle station located between Tom Price and Marble Bar and approximately 126 km South of Port Hedland in the Pilbara region of Western Australia.

The property also had 28 wells equipped with mills and a homestead and shearing shed. The Turner River flows through a portion of Abydos, and one of the neighbouring properties is Redcliffs Station.

The traditional owners of the area are the Kariyarra peoples, who maintain a strong connection with country at Abydos and the nearby Yandeyarra Community.

In 1912 the station was owned by Hall and Hester and was shipping bullocks out of Roebourne.

The rationing officer at the  station in 1930 was Frank Leeds; the station was in debt to the tune of 13,000 pounds at the time.

The formation was first reported in 1938.

The state government purchased Abydos and Woodstock stations in 1946. Both were set up to operate as research stations under the management of the CSIRO, Department of Agriculture and Institute of Agriculture of UWA.

The station suffered some damage in 1947 when a cyclone passed through the area. The shearing shed and the cook's quarters were blown over, and an estimated  of rain fell.

See also
List of ranches and stations
List of pastoral leases in Western Australia

References

Pastoral leases in Western Australia
Pilbara
Stations (Australian agriculture)